Neuchâtel Airport is an airport in Neuchâtel, Switzerland.

References

Notes

Airports in Switzerland